FMM may refer to:

 Confederation of Malagasy Workers
 Fast multipole method
 Functional membrane microdomain
 Father Michael McGivney Catholic Academy, in Markham, Ontario, Canada
 Fellowship in Manufacturing Management, a program of Cranfield University, England
 Festival Músicas do Mundo, a Portuguese music festival
 Field Marshal Montgomery Pipe Band
 Flea Market Music, an American publisher
 Florida Maritime Museum
 Fort Morgan Municipal Airport, in Colorado, United States
 France Médias Monde
 Franciscan Missionaries of Mary
 Free Media Movement
 Mainz-Mombach station, in Germany
 Memmingen Airport, in Germany
World Federation for the Metallurgic Industry, a former global union federation